Provincial road N710 (N710) is a road connecting N711 in Swifterbant with N305 in Biddinghuizen.

External links

710
710